The electoral district of Yarraville was a district of the Legislative Assembly in the Australian state of Victoria.

Members

Election results

References

Former electoral districts of Victoria (Australia)
1958 establishments in Australia
1967 disestablishments in Australia